Samurai-Ghost is a 1992 hack and slash video game released by Namco for the TurboGrafx-16. It is the sequel to Genpei Tōma Den. It was released on the Wii Virtual Console in North America on October 29, 2007, and in Europe on November 2, 2007.

Gameplay

As with the previous game, the player controls the resurrected samurai Taira no Kagekiyo, defeating demons and monsters across several levels. Given his undead nature, Kagekiyo has access to supernatural powers such as levitation and the ability to cast energy projectiles.

Samurai-Ghost has a similar plot to its predecessor, in that Kagekiyo fights against Minamoto no Yoshitsune, Saitō Musashibō Benkei, and his arch enemy Minamoto no Yoritomo. Kagekiyo now also faces Minamoto no Yoshinaka (also known as Kiso no Yoshinaka), who commits seppuku when defeated.

Development and release

Reception

Samurai-Ghost was met with mixed reception from critcis. However, fan reception was positive: readers of PC Engine Fan voted to give the game a 20.28 out of 30 score, ranking at the number 328 spot in a poll, indicating a popular following.

Notes

References

External links
 Samurai-Ghost at GameFAQs
 Samurai-Ghost at Giant Bomb
 Samurai-Ghost at MobyGames

1992 video games
Namco games
Now Production games
Single-player video games
TurboGrafx-16 games
Video game sequels
Video games about samurai
Video games developed in Japan
Video games set in feudal Japan
Virtual Console games